Mitalee Jagtap Varadkar is an Indian actress who works in the Marathi film industry. She is known for her role in the film Baboo Band Baaja (2010), which fetched her a National Film Award for Best Actress at the 58th National Film Awards. The award was presented by the jury for portraying with finesse a mother who strives to achieve for her son a better future than the one denied to her by circumstances. She shared this award title with Saranya Ponvannan for the latter's role in the Tamil film Thenmerku Paruvakaatru.

Varadkar is a trained classical dancer and did experimental theatre in Aurangabad, Maharashtra before moving to her film career.

Filmography
 Raju
 Aag
 Vitthal Vitthal
 Baboo Band Baaja (2010)
 Asava Sunder Swapnancha Bangla - ETV Marathi serial
 2001 Kkusum as Sharmila

References

Living people
Indian film actresses
Best Actress National Film Award winners
People from Aurangabad district, Maharashtra
Year of birth missing (living people)